John Collins may refer to:

Arts and entertainment
 John Collins (poet) (1742–1808), English orator, singer, and poet
 John Churton Collins (1848–1908), English literary critic
 John H. Collins (director) (1889–1918), American director and screenwriter
 John Collins (jazz guitarist) (1913–2001), American jazz guitarist
 John Collins (cartoonist) (1917–2007), Canadian cartoonist
 Johnny Collins (1938–2009), British folksinger
 John D. Collins (born 1942), British actor known for Allo 'Allo
 John Collins (theatre director) (born 1969), American experimental theater director
 John Collins (Australian musician) (born 1971), bass guitarist for Powderfinger
 John Collins (musician/researcher), musician in the West African music scene
 John Collins (Canadian musician), musician with the New Pornographers and the Smugglers

Military
 John Collins (Bengal Army officer) (died 1807), British colonel in the Bengal Native Infantry
 John Collins (VC) (1880–1951), English sergeant who was awarded a Victoria Cross
 John Augustine Collins (1899–1989), Royal Australian Navy officer

Politics

American politicians
 John Collins (Continental Congress) (1717–1795), Rhode Island delegate to Continental Congress
 John Collins (governor) (1776–1822), American manufacturer and Governor of Delaware
 John Collins (Seattle politician) (1835–1903), American politician and businessman
 John F. Collins (mayor of Providence) (1872–1962), mayor of Providence, Rhode Island, 1939–1941
 John F. Collins (1919–1995), mayor of Boston, Massachusetts, 1960–1968

Other politicians
 John Collins (Andover MP) (1624–1711), English academic and politician
 John Collins (Surveyor General) (died 1795), Surveyor General of Provincial Canada
 John Collins (Canadian politician) (1922–2016), physician and politician in Newfoundland, Canada
 John Henry Collins (1880–1952), nationalist politician and solicitor in Northern Ireland

Religion
 John Collins (Independent minister) (c. 1632–1687), English Independent minister
 John J. Collins (bishop) (1856–1934), American-born Catholic bishop in Jamaica
 John Collins (priest) (1905–1982), radical Anglican canon at St Paul's Cathedral
 John A. Collins (chaplain) (1931–2003), Chief of Chaplains of the U.S. Air Force
 John Collins (nuncio) (1889–1961), Irish bishop and diplomat in Liberia
 John T. C. B. Collins (priest) (1925–2022), Anglican priest and leading figure in the charismatic movement

Sports

Association football
 John Collins (footballer, born 1942), English professional footballer
 John Collins (footballer, born 1945), English professional footballer and manager
 John Collins (footballer, born 1949) (1949–2020), Welsh professional footballer
 John Collins (footballer, born 1968), Scottish international footballer and manager

Other sports
 John Collins (New Zealand cricketer) (1868–1943), New Zealand cricketer
 Shano Collins (John Francis Collins, 1885–1955), American baseball player
 John Collins (Fijian cricketer) (fl. 1895), Fijian cricketer
 John W. Collins (1912–2001), American chess player
 John Collins (sports executive) (born 1961), COO of the National Hockey League
 John Collins (rower) (born 1989), British rower
 John Collins (basketball) (born 1997), American basketball player in the NBA
 Jon Collins (born 1960s), American basketball player in the 1980s

Other people
 John Collins (mathematician) (1625–1683), English mathematician
 John Baptist Collins (died 1794), French pirate
 John Collins (merchant) (died 1795), merchant in Quebec
 John A. Collins (1810–1900), American abolitionist and utopian from Skaneateles Community
 John Collins Covell (1823–1887), American educator and school administrator
 John S. Collins (1837–1928), American Quaker farmer who moved to southern Florida
 John H. Collins (academic) (1902–1981), American classical scholar
 John Collins (British businessman) (born 1941), former head of National Power
 John Joseph Collins (born 1944), Irish barrister
 John J. Collins (born 1946), Irish biblical studies scholar
 John Norman Collins (born 1947), perpetrator of the Michigan murders
 John C. Collins (born 1949), American theoretical particle physicist
 John A. Collins (abolitionist) (1810–1879), American abolitionist
 C. John Collins, American academic and professor of Old Testament

Other uses
 John Collins (cocktail), an alcoholic beverage

See also 
 John Collins-Muhammad (born 1991), American politician
 Jon R. Collins (1923–1987), associate justice of the Supreme Court of Nevada
 Collins (surname)
 Jack Collins (disambiguation)
 John Collings (disambiguation)
 Sean Collins (disambiguation)
 Collins John (born 1985), Dutch footballer

Collins, John